Santa Rosa Valley is a rural unincorporated community, named after the eponymous valley in which it lies, located in Ventura County, California, United States. For statistical purposes, the United States Census Bureau has defined Santa Rosa Valley as a census-designated place (CDP). The census definition of the area may not precisely correspond to local understanding of the area with the same name. The 2010 United States census reported Santa Rosa Valley's population was 3,334.

It lies within the County of Ventura north of Newbury Park, between Thousand Oaks and Camarillo. Norwegian Grade, which was constructed by the Norwegian Colony, connects Santa Rosa Valley to Thousand Oaks, while it may be reached from Santa Rosa Road in Camarillo.

The Santa Rosa Valley lies right north of the Conejo Valley and along the Arroyo Santa Rosa and Arroyo Conejo. Most of the area consists of agricultural lands and it is home to a variety of wildlife such as bobcats, gray foxes, mule deer, coyotes, and more. The valley is likely the habitat for more than one Mountain lion, and lions are relatively often observed here. Immediately to the south is the Conejo Canyons Open Space, with trails leading to the Arroyo Conejo Nature Preserve (La Branca) and Hill Canyon, and the community also borders Mount Clef Ridge and Wildwood Regional Park to the south.

Santa Rosa Valley was home to a Chumash village in pre-colonial times, known as Šumpaši, which was located by Conejo Creek.

Geography
According to the United States Census Bureau, the CDP covers an area of 6.9 square miles (17.8 km), all of it land.

Demographics
The 2010 United States Census reported that Santa Rosa Valley had a population of 3,334. The racial makeup of Santa Rosa Valley was 2,904 (87.1%) White, 23 (0.7%) African American, 13 (0.4%) Native American, 187 (5.6%) Asian, 4 (0.1%) Pacific Islander, 102 (3.1%) from other races, and 101 (3.0%) from two or more races. Hispanic or Latino of any race were 353 persons (10.6%).

The Census reported that 3,334 people (100% of the population) lived in households, 0 (0%) lived in non-institutionalized group quarters, and 0 (0%) were institutionalized.

There were 1,113 households, out of which 383 (34.4%) had children under the age of 18 living in them, 896 (80.5%) were opposite-sex married couples living together, 58 (5.2%) had a female householder with no husband present, 23 (2.1%) had a male householder with no wife present.  There were 25 (2.2%) unmarried opposite-sex partnerships, and 8 (0.7%) same-sex married couples or partnerships. 100 households (9.0%) were made up of individuals, and 37 (3.3%) had someone living alone who was 65 years of age or older. The average household size was 3.00.  There were 977 families (87.8% of all households); the average family size was 3.16.

The population was spread out, with 727 people (21.8%) under the age of 18, 277 people (8.3%) aged 18 to 24, 446 people (13.4%) aged 25 to 44, 1,386 people (41.6%) aged 45 to 64, and 498 people (14.9%) who were 65 years of age or older.  The median age was 48.9 years. For every 100 females, there were 96.2 males.  For every 100 females age 18 and over, there were 93.1 males.

The homeowner vacancy rate was 0.5%; the rental vacancy rate was 2.6%.  3,117 people (93.5% of the population) lived in owner-occupied housing units and 217 people (6.5%) lived in rental housing units.

References

Census-designated places in Ventura County, California
Census-designated places in California